This article contains information about the literary events and publications of 1975.

Events
January 1 – English-born comic writer P. G. Wodehouse is awarded a knighthood, six weeks before he dies in the United States.
January – Colin Dexter's detective novel Last Bus to Woodstock introduces his Oxford police officer, Inspector Morse.
April 23
Barbara Pym and Philip Larkin meet in person for the first time, at the Randolph Hotel, Oxford, after years of correspondence.
Harold Pinter's play No Man's Land is premièred by the National Theatre at The Old Vic in London, directed by Peter Hall and starring Sir John Gielgud and Sir Ralph Richardson.
April 28 – Harold Pinter leaves his first wife, the actress Vivien Merchant, having begun an affair with the married biographer Lady Antonia Fraser on January 8.
May 10 – Leftist Salvadoran poet, journalist and political activist Roque Dalton (born 1935) is assassinated by former colleagues in the People's Revolutionary Army (El Salvador).
August 12 – As the 20-year time limit stipulated by Thomas Mann at his death expires, sealed packets of 32 of the author's notebooks are opened in Zürich, Switzerland.
unknown dates
Writing as Émile Ajar, the author Romain Gary becomes the only person to win the Prix Goncourt twice.
Radical Australian poet Dorothy Hewett publishes her collection Rapunzel in Suburbia, triggering a successful libel action by her ex-husband.
Hearing Secret Harmonies, the twelfth and final novel in the A Dance to the Music of Time series begun in 1951 by Anthony Powell, is published.
The French critic Hélène Cixous coins the term Écriture féminine in an article, "Le Rire de la méduse".
Milan Kundera emigrates from Czechoslovakia to France, to take up an academic position at the University of Rennes.
The Petrarca-Preis is founded by Hubert Burda.

New books

Fiction
Chabua Amirejibi – Data Tutashkhia
Edward Abbey – The Monkey Wrench Gang
Dritëro Agolli – Njeriu me top (The Man with the Cannon)
Robert Aickman – Cold Hand in Mine: Eight Strange Stories
Martin Amis – Dead Babies
Natalie Babbitt –  Tuck Everlasting
Donald Barthelme – The Dead Father
Saul Bellow – Humboldt's Gift
Thomas Berger – Sneaky People
Thomas Bernhard – Correction (Korrektur)
Jorge Luis Borges – The Book of Sand (El libro de arena, short stories)
Malcolm Bradbury – The History Man
John Braine – The Pious Agent
Malcolm Bradbury – The History Man
Charles Bukowski – Factotum
Morley Callaghan – A Fine and Private Place
J. L. Carr – How Steeple Sinderby Wanderers Won the F.A. Cup
Agatha Christie – Curtain: Poirot's last case (written in 1940s)
James Clavell – Shōgun
Michael Crichton – The Great Train Robbery
A. J. Cronin – The Minstrel Boy
Robertson Davies – World of Wonders
L. Sprague de Camp and Fletcher Pratt – The Compleat Enchanter
Samuel R. Delany – Dhalgren
Michel Déon – The Foundling Boy (Le Jeune Homme vert)
August Derleth – Harrigan's File
Guram Dochanashvili – The First Garment
E. L. Doctorow – Ragtime
Max Frisch – Montauk
Carlos Fuentes – Terra Nostra
William Gaddis – J R
Gabriel García Márquez – The Autumn of the Patriarch (El Otoño del Patriarca)
Romain Gary as Émile Ajar – The Life Before Us (La vie devant soi)
Rumer Godden – The Peacock Spring
Arthur Hailey – The Moneychangers
Peter Handke – A Moment of True Feeling (Die Stunde der wahren Empfindung)
Thomas Harris – Black Sunday
Xavier Herbert – Poor Fellow My Country
Georgette Heyer – My Lord John
Jack Higgins – The Eagle Has Landed
Ruth Prawer Jhabvala – Heat and Dust
Gayl Jones – Corregidora
Stephen King – Salem's Lot
Sheridan Le Fanu (died 1873) – The Purcell Papers
Derek Lambert – Touch the Lion's Paw
David Lodge – Changing Places
Robert Ludlum – The Road to Gandolfo
John D. MacDonald – The Dreadful Lemon Sky
Bharati Mukherjee – Wife
Abdul Rahman Munif – East of the Mediterranean
Gary Myers – The House of the Worm
V. S. Naipaul – Guerrillas
N. Richard Nash - Cry Macho
Tim O'Brien – Northern Lights
Gerald W. Page, editor – Nameless Places
Robert B. Parker – Mortal Stakes
Georges Perec – W, or the Memory of Childhood (W, ou le Souvenir d'enfance)
Elizabeth Peters – Crocodile on the Sandbank (first in the Amelia Peabody series)
Baltasar Porcel – Horses into the Night (Cavalls cap a la fosca)
Anthony Powell – Hearing Secret Harmonies
James Purdy – In a Shallow Grave
Judith Rossner – Looking for Mr. Goodbar
Joanna Russ – The Female Man
Nawal El Saadawi – Woman at Point Zero (Emra'a Enda Noktat el Sifr)
Paul Scott – A Division of the Spoils
Anya Seton – Smouldering Fires
Gerald Seymour – Harry's Game
Tom Sharpe – Blott on the Landscape
Robert Shea and Robert Anton Wilson – The Illuminatus! Trilogy (individual editions)
M. P. Shiel – Xélucha and Others
Rex Stout – A Family Affair
Glendon Swarthout – The Shootist
Julian Symons – A Three-Pipe Problem
Joseph Wambaugh – The Choirboys
Keith Waterhouse – Billy Liar on the Moon
Jack Vance – Showboat World
Georgi Vladimov – Faithful Ruslan: The Story of a Guard Dog («Верный Руслан. История караульной собаки», first trade publication)
Roger Zelazny – Sign of the Unicorn

Children and young people
Verna Aardema (with Leo and Diane Dillon) – Why Mosquitoes Buzz in People's Ears
Nina Bawden – The Peppermint Pig
Susan Cooper – The Grey King
Roald Dahl – Danny, the Champion of the World
Rumer Godden – Mr. McFadden's Hallowe'en
Peter Härtling – Oma (Grandma)
Eva Ibbotson – The Great Ghost Rescue
Ronald McCuaig – Fresi Fantastika (Norwegian translation of Gangles)
Ruth Park – The Muddle-Headed Wombat and the Invention
Bill Peet
Cyrus the Unsinkable Sea Serpent
The Gnats of Knotty Pine
Robert Westall – The Machine Gunners

Drama
Alan Ayckbourn – Bedroom Farce
Patrick Galvin – We Do It For Love
Trevor Griffiths – Comedians
Christopher Hampton – Treats
David Hare
Fanshen
Teeth 'n' Smiles
Colin Higgins and Denis Cannan with Peter Brook – The Ik
Franz Xaver Kroetz
Geisterbahn (Ghost Train)
Das Nest (The Nest)
Tom Murphy – The Sanctuary Lamp
Stewart Parker – Spokesong
Harold Pinter – No Man's Land
Wole Soyinka – Death and the King's Horseman
Ben Travers – The Bed Before Yesterday
Charles Wood – Jingo

Poetry

Lin Carter – Dreams from R'lyeh
Leslie Norris – Mountains, Polecats, Pheasants and other Elegies

Non-fiction
Philip Agee – Inside the Company: CIA Diary
Kingsley Amis – Rudyard Kipling and His World
Robert Bresson – Notes on the Cinematographer (Notes sur le cinématographe)
Jacob Bronowski – The Ascent of Man
Mary Chamberlain – Fenwomen: a portrait of women in an English village
L. Sprague de Camp
Blond Barbarians and Noble Savages
Lovecraft: A Biography
The Miscast Barbarian: a Biography of Robert E. Howard
Michel Foucault – Discipline and Punish: The Birth of the Prison (Surveiller et punir: Naissance de la prison)
Paul Fussell – The Great War and Modern Memory
Paul Horgan – Lamy of Santa Fe
Frank Belknap Long – Howard Phillips Lovecraft: Dreamer on the Nightside
Philip Roth – Reading Myself and Others
Peter Singer – Animal Liberation
Paul Theroux – The Great Railway Bazaar

Births
January 13 – Daniel Kehlmann, German novelist
February 25 – Carrie Mac, Canadian young-adult fiction writer
February 27 – Cynan Jones, Welsh novelist
April 11 – Walid Soliman, Tunisian author and translator
June 23
Hugh Howey, American science-fiction writer
Markus Zusak, Australian young-adult novelist
July 19 – Martina Montelius, Swedish playwright
August 20 – Matthew and Michael Dickman, American poets
October 13 - Robin Parrish, American speculative fiction writer
October 27 – Zadie Smith (Sadie Smith), English novelist
December 19 – Brandon Sanderson, American fiction writer
unknown dates
Gavin Francis, Scottish medical writer and physician
Shehan Karunatilaka, Sri Lankan English-language novelist

Deaths
January 15 – Sydney Goodsir Smith, Scottish poet, dramatist and novelist (heart attack, born 1915)
February 14
Sir Julian Huxley, English biologist and author (born 1887)
Sir P. G. Wodehouse, English-born comic novelist (born 1881)
February 20 – Ivan Sokolov-Mikitov, Russian author (born 1882)
March 3 – T. H. Parry-Williams, Welsh poet (born 1887)
March 7 – Kate Seredy, Hungarian-born American children's writer and illustrator (born 1899)
March 13 – Ivo Andrić, Serbo-Croatian novelist and Nobel laureate (born 1892)
April 23 – Rolf Dieter Brinkmann, German poet (killed in hit-and-run-accident in London, born 1940)
May 21 – A. H. Dodd, Welsh historian (born 1891)
June 8 – Murray Leinster (William Fitzgerald Jenkins), American science fiction writer (born 1896)
July 10 – Peter Frederick Anson, English writer on religion and maritime matters (born 1889)
September 20 – Saint-John Perse (Alexis Leger), French poet and Nobel laureate (born 1887)
October 5 – Lady Constance Malleson, Irish actress and writer (born 1895)
October 22 – Arnold J. Toynbee, English historian (born 1889)
November 13 – R. C. Sherriff, English dramatist and novelist (born 1896)
November 19 – Elizabeth Taylor, English novelist (cancer, born 1912)
November 27 – Ross McWhirter, English sports journalist and joint compiler of Guinness Book of Records (assassinated, born 1925)
December 4 – Hannah Arendt, German-American philosopher (born 1906)
December 7 – Thornton Wilder, American novelist and dramatist (born 1897)

Awards
Nobel Prize for Literature: Eugenio Montale

Canada
See 1975 Governor General's Awards for a complete list of winners and finalists for those awards.

France
Prix Goncourt: Romain Gary as Emile Ajar – La vie devant soi
Prix Médicis French: Jacques Almira, Le Voyage à Naucratis
Prix Médicis International: Steven Millhauser, La Vie trop brève d'Edwin Mulhouse – United States

Spain
Premio Nadal: Francisco Umbral, Las ninfas

United Kingdom
Booker Prize: Ruth Prawer Jhabvala, Heat and Dust
Carnegie Medal for children's literature: Robert Westall, The Machine Gunners
Cholmondeley Award: Jenny Joseph, Norman MacCaig, John Ormond
Duff Cooper Prize: Seamus Heaney, North
Eric Gregory Award: John Birtwhistle, Duncan Bush, Val Warner, Philip Holmes, Peter Cash, Alasdair Paterson
James Tait Black Memorial Prize for fiction: Brian Moore, The Great Victorian Collection
James Tait Black Memorial Prize for biography: Karl Miller, Cockburn's Millennium

United States
American Academy of Arts and Letters Gold Medal for Belles Lettres: Kenneth Burke
Nebula Award: Joe Haldeman, The Forever War
Newbery Medal for children's literature: Virginia Hamilton, M. C. Higgins, the Great
Newdigate Prize: Andrew Motion
Pulitzer Prize for Drama: Edward Albee, Seascape
Pulitzer Prize for Fiction: Michael Shaara – The Killer Angels
Pulitzer Prize for Poetry: Gary Snyder – Turtle Island

Elsewhere
Miles Franklin Award: Xavier Herbert, Poor Fellow My Country
Viareggio Prize: Paolo Volponi, Il sipario ducale

References

 
Years of the 20th century in literature